Parc départemental Pierre-Lagravère, often called by its old name, Parc de l'Île Marante, is a public park located on the banks of the river Seine in Colombes, northwest of Paris. It is also the seat of Centre sportif municipal Parc Lagravère, a public multisports complex.

Its common name comes from its location on Île Marante, a former island in the Seine. The island's now disappeared English-style garden designed by Claude-Henri Watelet was a favorite getaway for the local nobility during the Ancien Régime. The area was also a popular subject for painters, especially impressionists such as Gustave Caillebotte and Claude Monet, who lived in Colombes and nearby Argenteuil, respectively, and frequently sailed the Seine.

The island was joined to the mainland circa 1965 to provide foundations for the building of the A86 autoroute, which today stands between the park and downtown Colombes (several bridges connect both sides).
The city of Colombes and the département of Hauts-de-Seine split jurisdiction over the newly accessible land. The city used parts of it to create a second sports and recreation district, separate from the historic Stade Yves-du-Manoir.
Meanwhile, the département took over the surrounding areas and remodelled them as a public park loosely inspired by the old Watelet garden. The park opened in 1973, and in 1985 was renamed after Pierre Lagravère, who was the first president of the département upon its creation in 1968.

Cycling and jogging
Parc Lagravère is the final stop of the Promenade Bleue, a bike and walking trail created in 2010 that became a leg of the Paris–London Avenue Verte in 2012.
Since 1991, the venue has offered a BMX park, which is managed by a resident club.
The route of the 1924 Summer Olympics cross country race ran alongside Île Marante, although it stayed on the dam built on the mainland side, and did not venture onto the island proper as only a barge allowed crossings at the time.

Centre sportif municipal Parc Lagravère

Olympic swimming pool
The first step taken to establish Île Marante as a sports complex was to replace the city's relatively recent outdoor swimming pool, located downtown in the vicinity of Stade Yves-du-Manoir, with a new indoor facility on the former island, which opened in 1969. Like the park's future ice rink, it was designed by architect Henry Pottier, who was in charge of an urban renewal plan for the northwestern districts of Colombes at the time.
In addition to being used by the hometown Colombes Natation, it has also been used by Racing Club de France as the club has strong ties to the city.
The pool is being renovated for use as a training facility during the 2024 Olympic Games.

Philippe Candeloro Ice Rink

An ice rink was added to the park in 1974.
In 2018, it was renamed after ISU World Championship and Olympic medal winning figure skater Philippe Candeloro, who grew up and started his career in Colombes.
It served as the home ice for the Français Volants, Paris' oldest existing hockey team, across several stints in the mid 1970s and 1980s. However, it was not associated with a true resident hockey club until another organization, the Anges du Vésinet, faced with the permanent loss of their rink to a fire, moved there in 2002, later changing their name to Anges de Colombes.
The venue hosted the 1978 ice hockey Coupe de France final, and the 1992 French Figure Skating Championships.

Colombes Tennis Club
Colombes Tennis Club offers eleven courts and is managed by the eponymous association. The five indoor courts are made of natural clay, while the six outdoor courts rely on a mix of acrylic (GreenSet), synthetic clay and natural clay. The facility was completed in 1975.

References

External links
Le parc Pierre-Lagravère – Département of Hauts-de-Seine (in French)
Philippe Candeloro Ice Rink – City of Colombes (in French)
Swimming pool – City of Colombes (in French)
Tennis – City of Colombes (in French)

Sports venues in Hauts-de-Seine
Indoor arenas in France
Indoor ice hockey venues in France
Sports venues completed in 1969
Sports venues completed in 1973
Sports venues completed in 1974
1973 establishments in France
Urban public parks